Achraf Saafi (born 11 August 1992) is a Tunisian handball player for Sahel HC and the Tunisian national team.

He represented Tunisia at the 2019 World Men's Handball Championship.

References

1992 births
Living people
Tunisian male handball players
Competitors at the 2018 Mediterranean Games
Mediterranean Games silver medalists for Tunisia
Mediterranean Games medalists in handball